Hugo de Garis (born 1947) is an Australian retired researcher in the sub-field of artificial intelligence (AI) known as evolvable hardware. He became known in the 1990s for his research on the use of genetic algorithms to evolve artificial neural networks using three-dimensional cellular automata inside field programmable gate arrays. He claimed that this approach would enable the creation of what he terms "artificial brains" which would quickly surpass human levels of intelligence.

He has been noted for his belief that a major war between the supporters and opponents of intelligent machines, resulting in billions of deaths, is almost inevitable before the end of the 21st century. He suggests AI systems may simply eliminate the human race, and humans would be powerless to stop them because of technological singularity. This prediction has attracted debate and criticism from the AI research community, and some of its more notable members, such as Kevin Warwick, Bill Joy, Ken MacLeod, Ray Kurzweil, and Hans Moravec, have voiced their opinions on whether or not this future is likely.

De Garis originally studied theoretical physics, but he abandoned this field in favour of artificial intelligence. In 1992 he received his PhD from Université Libre de Bruxelles, Belgium. He worked as a researcher at ATR (Advanced Telecommunications Research Institute International, 国際電気通信基礎技術研究所), Japan from 1994–2000, a researcher at Starlab, Brussels from 2000–2001, and associate professor of computer science at Utah State University from 2001–2006. Until his retirement in late 2010 he was a professor at Xiamen University, where he taught theoretical physics and computer science, and ran the Artificial Brain Lab.

Evolvable hardware
From 1993 to 2000 de Garis participated in a research project at ATR's Human Information Processing Research Laboratories (ATR-HIP) which aimed to create a billion-neuron artificial brain by the year 2001. The project was known as "cellular automata machine brain," or "CAM-Brain." During this 8-year span he and his fellow researchers published a series of papers in which they discussed the use of genetic algorithms to evolve neural structures inside 3D cellular automata. They argued that existing neural models had failed to produce intelligent behaviour because they were too small, and that in order to create "artificial brains" it was necessary to manually assemble tens of thousands of evolved neural modules together, with the billion neuron "CAM-Brain" requiring around 10 million modules; this idea was rejected by Igor Aleksander, who said "The point is that these puzzles are not puzzles because our neural models are not large enough."

Though it was initially envisaged that these cellular automata would run on special computers, such as MIT's  "Cellular Automata Machine-8" (CAM-8), by 1996 it was realised that the model originally proposed, which required cellular automata with thousands of states, was too complex to be realised in hardware. The design was considerably simplified, and in 1997 the "collect and distribute 1 bit" ("CoDi-1Bit") model was published, and work began on a hardware implementation using Xilinx XC6264 FPGAs. This was to be known as the "CAM Brain Machine" (CBM).

The researchers evolved cellular automata for several tasks (using software simulation, not hardware):
 Reproducing the XOR function.
 Generating a bitstream that alternates between 0 and 1 three times (i.e. 000..111..000..).
 Generated a bitstream where the output alternates, but can be changed from a majority of 1s to a majority of 0s by toggling an input.
 Discriminating between two square wave inputs with a different period.
 Discriminating between horizontal lines (input on a 2D grid) and random noise.

Ultimately the project failed to produce a functional robot control system, and ATR terminated it along with the closure of ATR-HIP in February 2001.

The original aim of de Garis' work was to establish the field of "brain building" (a term of his invention) and to "create a trillion dollar industry within 20 years". Throughout the 90s his papers claimed that by 2001 the ATR "Robokoneko" (translation: kitten robot) project would develop a billion-neuron "cellular automata machine brain" (CAM-brain), with "computational power equivalent to 10,000 pentiums" that could simulate the brain of a real cat. de Garis received a US$0.4 million "fat brain building grant" to develop this. The first "CAM-brain" was delivered to ATR in 1999. After receiving a further US$1 million grant at Starlab de Garis failed to deliver a working "brain" before Starlab's bankruptcy. At USU de Garis announced he was establishing a "brain builder" group to create a second generation "CAM-brain".

Past research
de Garis published his last "CAM-Brain" research paper in 2002. He still works on evolvable hardware. Using a Celoxica FPGA board he says he can create up to 50,000 neural network modules for less than $3000.

Since 2002 he has co-authored several papers on evolutionary algorithms.

He believes that topological quantum computing is about to revolutionize computer science, and hopes that his teaching will help his students to understand its principles.

In 2008 de Garis received a 3 million Chinese yuan grant (around $436,000) to build an artificial brain for China (the China-Brain Project), as part of the Brain Builder Group at Wuhan University.

Hugo de Garis retired in 2010. Before that he was director of the artificial brains lab at Xiamen University in China. In 2013 he was studying Maths and Physics at PhD level and over the next 20 years plans to publish 500 graduate level free lecture videos. This is called "degarisMPC" and some lectures are already available.

Employment history
de Garis's original work on "CAM-brain" machines was part of an 8-year research project, from 1993 to 2000, at the ATR Human Information Processing Research Laboratories (ATR-HIP) in Kyoto Prefecture, Japan. de Garis left in 2000, and ATR-HIP was closed on 28 February 2001. de Garis then moved to Starlab in Brussels, where he received a million dollars in funding from the government of Belgium ("over a third of the Brussels government's total budget for scientific research", according to de Garis). Starlab went bankrupt in June 2001. A few months later de Garis was employed as an associate professor at the computer science department of Utah State University. In May 2006 he became a professor at Wuhan University's international school of software, teaching graduate level pure mathematics, theoretical physics and computer science.

Since June 2006 he has been a member of the advisory board of Novamente, a commercial company which aims to create artificial general intelligence.

The Artilect War
Hugo De Garis believes that a major war before the end of the 21st century, resulting in billions of deaths, is almost inevitable. Intelligent machines (or "artilects", a shortened form of "artificial intellects") will be far more intelligent than humans and will threaten to attain world domination, resulting in a conflict between "Cosmists", who support the artilects, and "Terrans", who oppose them (both of these are terms of his invention). He describes this conflict as a "gigadeath" war, reinforcing the point that billions of people will be killed. This scenario has been criticised by other AI researchers, including Chris Malcolm, who described it as "entertaining science fiction horror stories which happen to have caught the attention of the popular media". Kevin Warwick called it a "hellish nightmare, as portrayed in films such as the Terminator".
In 2005, de Garis published a book describing his views on this topic entitled The Artilect War: Cosmists vs. Terrans: A Bitter Controversy Concerning Whether Humanity Should Build Godlike Massively Intelligent Machines.

Cosmism is a moral philosophy that favours building or growing strong artificial intelligence and ultimately leaving Earth to the Terrans, who oppose this path for humanity. The first half of the book describes technologies which he believes will make it possible for computers to be billions or trillions of times more intelligent than humans. He predicts that as artificial intelligence improves and becomes progressively more human-like, differing views will begin to emerge regarding how far such research should be allowed to proceed. Cosmists will foresee the massive, truly astronomical potential of substrate-independent cognition, and will therefore advocate unlimited growth in the designated fields, in the hopes that "super intelligent" machines might one day colonise the universe. It is this "cosmic" view of history, in which the fate of one single species, on one single planet, is seen as insignificant next to the fate of the known universe, that gives the Cosmists their name. Hugo identifies with that group and noted that it "would be a cosmic tragedy if humanity freezes evolution at the puny human level".

Terrans, on the other hand, will have a more "terrestrial" Earth-centred view, in which the fate of the Earth and its species (like humanity) are seen as being all-important. To Terrans, a future without humans is to be avoided at all costs, as it would represent the worst-case scenario. As such, Terrans will find themselves unable to ignore the possibility that super intelligent machines might one day cause the destruction of the human race—being very immensely intelligent and so cosmically inclined, these artilect machines may have no more moral or ethical difficulty in exterminating humanity than humans do in using medicines to cure diseases. So, Terrans will see themselves as living during the closing of a window of opportunity, to disable future artilects before they are built, after which humans will no longer have a say in the affairs of intelligent machines.

It is these two extreme ideologies which de Garis believes may herald a new world war, wherein one group with a "grand plan" (the Cosmists) will be rabidly opposed by another which feels itself to be under deadly threat from that plan (the Terrans). The factions, he predicts, may eventually war to the death because of this, as the Terrans will come to view the Cosmists as "arch-monsters" when they begin seriously discussing acceptable risks, and the probabilities of large percentages of Earth-based life going extinct. In response to this, the Cosmists will come to view the Terrans as being reactionary extremists, and will stop treating them and their ideas seriously, further aggravating the situation, possibly beyond reconciliation.

Throughout his book, de Garis states that he is ambivalent about which viewpoint he ultimately supports, and attempts to make convincing cases for both sides. He elaborates towards the end of the book that the more he thinks about it, the more he feels like a Cosmist, because he feels that despite the horrible possibility that humanity might ultimately be destroyed, perhaps inadvertently or at least indifferently, by the artilects, he cannot ignore the fact that the human species is just another link in the evolutionary chain, and must become extinct in their current form anyway, whereas the artilects could very well be the next link in that chain and therefore would be excellent candidates to carry the torch of science and exploration forward into the rest of the universe.

He relates a morally isomorphic[mathematical conjecture. Citation needed] scenario in which extraterrestrial intelligences visit the earth three billion years ago and discover two domains of life living there, one domain which is older but simpler and contemporarily dominant, but which upon closer study appears to be incapable of much further evolutionary development; and one younger domain which is struggling to survive, but which upon further study displays the potential to evolve into all the varieties of life existing on the Earth today, including humanity, and then queries the reader as to whether they would feel ethically compelled to destroy the dominant domain of life to ensure the survival of the younger one, or to destroy the younger one in order to ensure the survival of the older and more populous domain which was "there first". He states that he believes that, like himself, most of the public would feel torn or at least ambivalent about the outcome of artilects at first, but that as the technology advances, the issue would be forced and most would feel compelled to choose a side, and that as such the public consciousness of the coming issue should be raised now so that society can choose, hopefully before the factions becomes irreconcilably polarised, which outcome it prefers.

He also predicts a third group that will emerge between the two. He refers to this third party as Cyborgians or Cyborgs, because they will not be opposed to artilects as such, but desire to become artilects themselves by adding components to their own human brains, rather than falling into obsolescence. They will seek to become artilects by gradually merging themselves with machines and think that the dichotomy between the Cosmists and Terrans can be avoided because all human beings would become artilects.
The transhumanist movement are usually identified as Cyborgians.

His concept of the Cyborgians might have stemmed from a conversation with Kevin Warwick: in 2000, de Garis noted, "Just out of curiosity, I asked Kevin Warwick whether he was a Terran or a Cosmist. He said he was against the idea of artilects being built (i.e., he is Terran). I was surprised, and felt a shiver go up my spine. That moment reminded me of a biography of Lenin that I had read in my 20s in which the Bolsheviks and the Mensheviks first started debating the future government of Russia. What began as an intellectual difference ended up as a Russian civil war after 1917 between the white and the red Russians".

Quotes
 "Humans should not stand in the way of a higher form of evolution. These machines are godlike. It is human destiny to create them."
— as quoted in New York Times Magazine of 1 August 1999, speaking of the 'artilects' of the future.
 "I believe that the ideological disagreements between these two groups on this issue will be so strong, that a major "artilect" war, killing billions of people, will be almost inevitable before the end of the 21st century."
— speaking in 2005 of the Cosmist/Terran conflict.
 "Twenty years from now, the author envisages the brain builder industry as being one of the world's top industries, comparable with oil, automobile, and construction."
— prediction made in 1996.

Writings

Political/Social activism

In recent years, De Garis has become vocal in the Masculist and Men Going Their Own Way (MGTOW) movements. He is a believer in anti-semitic conspiracy theories and has written (and presented on YouTube) a series of essays on the subject. Because of the danger of generalized anti-semitism (as manifested in Nazi Germany from 1932 to 1945), it should be noted that de Garis is not opposed to "all Jews," just those whom he denotes as "massively evil" (ME) or "ME Jews," which he claims are "a small subset of overall Jews who have sought totalitarian power," much as the Nazis were a small subset of "overall Germans who had attained totalitarian power," and one does not properly call "anti-Nazi conspiracy theorists" by the name "anti-German conspiracy theorists."

See also
 Artificial brain

References

External links
 De Garis is on the editorial board of Engineering Letters
 
 Notes from de Garis' presentation to the artificial general intelligence research institute
 Man vs. Machine – Article from Utah local newspaper
 Building Gods – Rough cut of a documentary which details, amongst other things, the personal beliefs of Hugo de Garis and Kevin Warwick on the possibilities of artificial life
 Human v 2.0 – Programme from the BBC Horizon series featuring discussion between Ray Kurzweil and Hugo de Garis
 Cosmism and brainbuilding – Article by de Garis
 Interview
 Interview from 2007 at Machines Like Us
 Interview with H+ Magazine

1947 births
Living people
Artificial intelligence researchers
Utah State University faculty
Futurologists
Memetics
Singularitarians
Cosmists
Australian transhumanists